Kempis is a surname, and may refer to:

 Gus Kempis (1865–1890), South African Test cricketer
 Nicolaes a Kempis (d. 1676), composer
 Joannes Florentius a Kempis (1635 – c.1711), Baroque composer, son of Nicholaus à Kempis
 Thomas à Kempis (c.1380 – 1471), late Medieval Catholic monk